

Season summary
Kaiserslautern started their season with a shock 1–0 win at reigning champions Bayern Munich, and followed this with a 1–0 victory against Hertha BSC that left them top of the table. From the fourth matchday onwards Kaiserslautern would not relinquish first place. By the beginning of the second half of the season Kaiserslautern were four points clear of Bayern, a lead increased to seven points after completing the double over the Bavarians. Bayern continued to falter and Kaiserslautern confirmed their second-ever Bundesliga title with a 4–0 victory over Wolfsburg in the penultimate round. This is the only time in Bundesliga history that a newly promoted side has won the title - the closest any team has come to repeating this feat was RB Leipzig's second place in 2016–17.

Players

First-team squad
Squad at end of season

Left club during season

Competitions

Bundesliga

League table

DFB-Pokal

References

1. FC Kaiserslautern seasons
Kaiserslautern
German football championship-winning seasons